The Women's Hong Kong squash Open 2012 is the women's edition of the 2012 Hong Kong Open, which is a WSA World Series event Gold (prize money: $70 000). The event take place at the Hong Kong Squash Centre in Hong Kong from 27 November to 2 December. Nicol David won her seventh Hong Kong Open trophy, beating Camille Serme in the final.

Prize money and ranking points
For 2012, the prize purse is $70,000. The prize money and points breakdown is as follows:

Seeds

Draw and results

See also
Hong Kong Open (squash)
Men's Hong Kong squash Open 2012
WSA World Series 2012

References

External links
Hong Kong squash Open 2012 Official website
WISPA Hong Kong squash Open 2012 website
Hong Kong squash Open 2012 Squash Site website
WSA Hong Kong squash Open 2012 website

Squash tournaments in Hong Kong
Women's Hong Kong squash Open
Women's Hong Kong squash Open
2012 in women's squash